Ústí nad Labem District is a district in the Ústí nad Labem Region of the Czech Republic. Its capital is the city of Ústí nad Labem.

Administrative division
Ústí nad Labem District is formed by only one administrative district of municipality with extended competence: Ústí nad Labem.

List of municipalities
Cities and towns are marked in bold:

Chabařovice -
Chlumec -
Chuderov -
Dolní Zálezly -
Habrovany -
Homole u Panny -
Libouchec -
Malé Březno -
Malečov -
Petrovice -
Povrly -
Přestanov -
Řehlovice -
Ryjice -
Stebno -
Tašov -
Telnice -
Tisá -
Trmice -
Ústí nad Labem -
Velké Březno -
Velké Chvojno -
Zubrnice

Geography

Ústí nad Labem District borders Germany in the north. The terrain is very varied – mostly hilly except in the west, and divided by the Elbe river valley. The territory extends into four geomorphological mesoregions: Central Bohemian Uplands (most of the territory), Most Basin (west), Ore Mountains (north) and Elbe Sandstone Mountains (small part in the northeast with the Tisa Rocks).

The most important river is the Elbe, which drains the entire territory. The Bílina flows into the Elbe in Ústí nad Labem. The largest body of water is Lake Milada, an extensive artificial lake created by flooding mine.

There are two protected landscape areas: České Středohoří that extends into the district in the south and east, and Labské pískovce that extends into the district in the northeast.

Demographics

Most populated municipalities

Economy
The largest employers with its headquarters in Ústí nad Labem District and at least 1,000 employers are:

The largest industrial employers with its headquarters in Ústí nad Labem District and at least 500 employers are:

Transport
The D8 motorway from Prague to Ústí nad Labem and Czech-German border passes through the district and constinues further to Dresden.

Ústí nad Labem District is an important junction. An important railway line from Prague to Dresden runs through it. The Elbe is used for ship transport.

Sights

The most important monuments in the district, protected as national cultural monuments, are:
Royal field with the monument to Přemysl the Ploughman in Stadice
Church of Saint Florian in Ústí nad Labem-Krásné Březno

The best-preserved settlements and landscape, protected as monument reservations and monument zones, are:
Zubrnice (monument reservation)
Chabařovice (monument zone)
The territory of the Battle of Kulm near Přestanov, Chlumec and Varvažov (monument zone)

The most visited tourist destination is the Ústí nad Labem Zoo.

References

External links

Ústí nad Labem District profile on the Czech Statistical Office's website

 
Districts of the Czech Republic